Olivet is a census-designated place in Elwood Township, Vermilion County, Illinois. As of the 2010 census, its population was 428.

References

External links
NACo

Census-designated places in Vermilion County, Illinois
Census-designated places in Illinois